David Whelan (born 28 August 1961) is an English golf instructor and former professional golfer on the European Tour.

Whelan was born in Sunderland, Tyne and Wear, according to his profile on the European Tour website. He became a professional in 1981 and gained playing privileges on the European Tour in 1987, having been unsuccessful in five previous attempts. During his first year on tour, 1988, he needed a £500 loan from his parents to participate in the Barcelona Open, which he received. Whelan won the tournament by defeating three players in a playoff, including Nick Faldo. In his career, he played in The Open Championship five times, with three made cuts.

During his playing career, Whelan received coaching from David Leadbetter, who became a mentor for him when he went into golf instruction. In 1993, he was hired by the David Leadbetter Golf Academy as European director of instruction. Ten years later, he relocated to Bradenton, Florida in the United States to work at Leadbetter's academy there. When then-director Gary Gilchrist left the academy in 2004, Whelan, his assistant at the time, was promoted to director. Among the players Whelan has taught are LPGA major champions Paula Creamer and Catriona Matthew, PGA Tour player Hunter Mahan, 2010 U.S. Amateur winner Peter Uihlein, and LPGA Tour players Jessica and Nelly Korda.

Professional wins (1)

European Tour wins (1)

European Tour playoff record (1–0)

Team appearances
Amateur
Jacques Léglise Trophy (representing Great Britain & Ireland): 1978

References

External links

English male golfers
European Tour golfers
British golf instructors
English people of Irish descent
Sportspeople from Sunderland
1961 births
Living people